Sterictiphorinae is a subfamily of argid sawflies in the family Argidae. There are more than 20 genera in Sterictiphorinae.

Genera
These 26 genera belong to the subfamily Sterictiphorinae:

 Acrogymnia Malaise, 1941
 Acrogymnidea Malaise, 1955
 Adurgoa Malaise, 1937
 Aproceros Malaise, 1931
 Aprosthema Konow, 1899
 Brachyphatnus Konow, 1906
 Didymia Lepeletier, 1825
 Duckeana Malaise, 1941
 Durgoa Malaise, 1937
 Manaos Rohwer, 1912
 Neoptilia Ashmead, 1898
 Ortasiceros Wei, 1997
 Pseudaprosthema Gussakovskij, 1935
 Ptenus Kirby, 1882
 Ptilia Lepeletier, 1825
 Schizocerella Forsius, 1927
 Sphacophilus Provancher, 1888
 Sterictiphora Billberg, 1820
 Styphelarge Benson, 1938
 Tanymeles Konow, 1906
 Trailia Cameron, 1878
 Trichorhachus Kirby, 1882
 Triptenus Malaise, 1937
 Trochophora Konow, 1905
 Yasumatsua Togashi, 1970
 Zynzus Smith, 1992

References

External links

 

Argidae